Kudal Point is a point in Papua New Guinea located in Milne Bay.

References

Headlands of Papua New Guinea
Geography of Milne Bay Province